David Leslie Hays (born 5 November 1944 in Finchley, Middlesex) was an English-born Scottish cricketer.

David Hays was educated at Highgate and the University of Cambridge. He represented Cambridge University (two blues) and Scotland in 25 first-class matches as a right-handed batsman and wicketkeeper between 1965 and 1980. As a member of the general committee, he appeared in one limited-over match for Middlesex in 1976, scoring 40.

External links
 Cricinfo
 Cricket Archive

1944 births
Living people
Cambridge University cricketers
Middlesex cricketers
Scottish cricketers
People educated at Highgate School
Scotland cricketers
Wicket-keepers